Australoschendyla capensis is a species of centipede in the Schendylidae family. It is endemic to Australia, and was first described in 1996 by R. E. Jones.

Description
This species has 41 or 43 trunk segments.

Distribution
The species occurs in coastal north-western Western Australia. The type locality is the North West Cape peninsula.

Behaviour
The centipedes are solitary terrestrial predators that inhabit plant litter and soil.

References

 

 
capensis
Centipedes of Australia
Endemic fauna of Australia
Fauna of Western Australia
Animals described in 1996